Nature studies was a late 19th-century educational movement.

Nature studies may also refer to:

Natural history, the study of plants, animals, and other organisms
Natural science, a broad branch of science
Nature Studies (manuscript), a 16th-century illustrated manuscript
Nature Studies, a musical piece by Adrian Beaumont
Nature Studies, 1882 book by Edward Clodd and others